The San Rafael Pacifics are a professional baseball team based in San Rafael, California, United States. They play in the Pecos League, an independent baseball league which is not affiliated with Major or Minor League Baseball. Prior to joining the Pecos League, they were a charter franchise of the six-team Pacific Association of Professional Baseball Clubs and were also members of the North American League in 2012.

The Pacifics franchise was launched by Centerfield Partners of Dublin, California. Along with a sister team owned and operated by Centerfield Partners, the Sonoma County Grapes, the Pacifics made their debut in the 2012 baseball season at 1,000-seat Albert Park in San Rafael. The team was purchased by Gabe Suárez in December 2018. The Pacifics were purchased by Andrew Dunn, founder of the Pecos League in March 2020 after the Pacifics and the Pacific Association agreed to not continue their affiliation due to major differences in operating a sound independent baseball league.

North American League (2012) 
The North American Baseball League was a nine-year-old, ten-team, professional, independent minor league formed from teams of the former Golden Baseball and United Baseball leagues. Play is typically described as A- to AA- caliber baseball, with players primarily coming from previous stints in the major league-affiliated AAA-, AA-, and A- leagues. The North American Baseball League folded in 2012. The Pacifics were the final champions of the league.

Pacific Association of Professional Baseball Clubs (2013–2019) 
The Pacifics' ownership, Redwood Sports and Entertainment, took the four former Northern Division teams from the NAL and created a new league, the Pacific Association of Professional Baseball Clubs. The league initially consisted of the Pacifics, Na Koa Ikaika Maui (also formerly of the GBL), Hawaii Stars, and Sonoma County Grapes. However, the Grapes folded and were replaced by the Vallejo Admirals.

In 2014, both Hawaii teams folded and the Sonoma Stompers and the Pittsburg Diamonds were added to the league.

In August 2018, the team announced that they were being put up for sale. In December 2018, the team announced that the team was purchased by Gabe Suárez.

On June 29, 2019, former Pacifics' pitcher Chris Mazza made his Major League Baseball debut for the New York Mets, becoming the first Pacific Association player to make the major leagues. 

In November 2019, the Pacifics announced their departure from the Pacific Association, citing a desire to join a new independent league in Northern California for the 2020 season and beyond.

On June 8, 2022, former Pacifics' pitcher Jared Koenig made his Major League Baseball debut for the Oakland Athletics, becoming the second Pacific to make the major leagues. Koenig won Pacific Association pitcher of the year in 2018, going 11-1 with a 3.54 era in 96 2/3 innings pitched. Koenig also set a Pacific Association record with 140 strikeouts.

Pecos League (2020–present) 
On March 12, 2020, the Pecos League announced they purchased the team from Gabe Suárez, and would compete in the Pacific Division of the league for the 2020 season and beyond.

Roster

Season-by-season results

Notable alumni

 Jailen Peguero (2019)
 J.P. Howell (2018)
 Chris Mazza (2018)
 Jared Koenig (2017-18)
 Eric Byrnes (2014)
 Bill "Spaceman" Lee (2012-2013)

References

External links
 San Rafael Pacifics website

Pecos League teams
North American League teams
Professional baseball teams in California
San Rafael, California
Sports teams in the San Francisco Bay Area
2011 establishments in California
Baseball teams established in 2011
Pacific Association of Professional Baseball Clubs teams